Sings Spirituals is the fifth studio album by B. B. King, released in 1960. He is backed by organ, piano, drums and bass, and accompanied vocally by two groups of Angeleno singers: the Charioteers and the Southern California Community Choir.

Track listing
All songs are derived from traditional hymns, except where noted

Bonus tracks
"A Lonely Lover's Plea" (Riley B. King, Jules Taub, Sam Ling)
"I Am" (Earl Shuman, Sherman Edwards)
"The Key to My Kingdom" (Claude Baum, Joe Josea, Maxwell Davis)
"Story from My Heart and Soul" (Riley B. King, Jules Taub)
"In the Middle of an Island" (Nick Acquaviva, Ted Varnick)
"Sixteen Tons" (Merle Travis)
"Precious Lord" (Thomas A. Dorsey)
"Swing Low, Sweet Chariot" (Traditional)

References

1959 albums
B.B. King albums
Crown Records albums
Gospel albums by American artists

pl:The Blues